Merseyside is a metropolitan and ceremonial county in North West England, with a population of 1.38 million. It encompasses both banks of the Mersey Estuary and comprises five metropolitan boroughs: Knowsley, St Helens, Sefton, Wirral and the city of Liverpool. Merseyside, which was created on 1 April 1974 as a result of the Local Government Act 1972, takes its name from the River Mersey and sits within the historic counties of Lancashire and Cheshire.

Merseyside spans  of land. It borders the ceremonial counties of Lancashire (to the north-east), Greater Manchester (to the east), Cheshire (to the south and south-east) and the Irish Sea to the west. North Wales is across the Dee Estuary. There is a mix of high density urban areas, suburbs, semi-rural and rural locations in Merseyside, but overwhelmingly the land use is urban. It has a focused central business district, formed by Liverpool City Centre, but Merseyside is also a polycentric county with five metropolitan districts, each of which has at least one major town centre and outlying suburbs. The Liverpool Urban Area is the fifth most populous conurbation in England and dominates the geographic centre of the county, while the Birkenhead Urban Area dominates the Wirral Peninsula in the south.

In the 12 years following 1974, the county had a two-tier system of local government; district councils shared power with the Merseyside County Council. The county council was abolished in 1986 and so its districts (the metropolitan boroughs) are now effectively unitary authority areas. However, the metropolitan county continues to exist in law and as a geographic frame of reference, and several county-wide services are co-ordinated by authorities and joint-boards, such as Merseytravel (for public transport), Merseyside Fire and Rescue Service and the Merseyside Police (for law-enforcement); as a ceremonial county, Merseyside has a Lord Lieutenant and a High Sheriff. As the Lancashire county palatine boundaries remain the same as the historic boundaries, the High Sheriff of Merseyside, along with those of Lancashire and Greater Manchester are appointed "within the Duchy and County Palatine of Lancaster".

The boroughs of Merseyside are joined by the neighbouring borough of Halton in Cheshire to form the Liverpool City Region, which is a local enterprise partnership and combined authority area.

Merseyside is an amalgamation of 22 former local government districts from the former administrative counties of Lancashire, Cheshire and six autonomous county boroughs centred on Birkenhead, Bootle, Liverpool, Southport, St Helens and Wallasey.

History

Merseyside was designated as a "Special Review" area in the Local Government Act 1958, and the Local Government Commission for England started a review of this area in 1962, based around the core county boroughs of Liverpool, Bootle, Birkenhead and Wallasey. Further areas, including Widnes and Runcorn, were added to the Special Review Area by Order in 1965. Draft proposals were published in 1965, but the commission never completed its final proposals as it was abolished in 1966.

Instead, a Royal Commission was set up to review English local government entirely, and its report (known as the Redcliffe-Maud Report) proposed a much wider Merseyside metropolitan area covering southwest Lancashire and northwest Cheshire, extending as far south as Chester and as far north as the River Ribble. This would have included four districts: Southport/Crosby, Liverpool/Bootle, St Helens/Widnes and Wirral/Chester. In 1970 the Merseyside Passenger Transport Executive (which operates today under the Merseytravel brand) was set up, covering Liverpool, Sefton, Wirral and Knowsley, but excluding Southport and St Helens.

The Redcliffe-Maud Report was rejected by the incoming Conservative Party government, but the concept of a two-tier metropolitan area based on the Mersey area was retained. A White Paper was published in 1971. The Local Government Bill presented to Parliament involved a substantial trimming from the White Paper, excluding the northern and southern fringes of the area, excluding Chester, Ellesmere Port (and, unusually, including Southport, whose council had requested to be included). Further alterations took place in Parliament, with Skelmersdale being removed from the area, and a proposed district including St Helens and Huyton being subdivided into what are now the metropolitan boroughs of St Helens and Knowsley.

Merseyside was created on 1 April 1974 from areas previously part of the administrative counties of Lancashire and Cheshire, along with the county boroughs of Birkenhead, Wallasey, Liverpool, Bootle, and St Helens. Following the creation of Merseyside, Merseytravel expanded to take in St Helens and Southport.

Between 1974 and 1986 the county had a two-tier system of local government with the five boroughs sharing power with the Merseyside County Council. However, in 1986 the government of Margaret Thatcher abolished the county council along with all other metropolitan county councils, and so its boroughs are now effectively unitary authorities.

Geography

Merseyside is divided into two parts by the Mersey Estuary; the Wirral is located on the west side of the estuary, upon the Wirral Peninsula and the rest of the county is located on the east side of the estuary. The eastern part of Merseyside borders onto Lancashire to the north, Greater Manchester to the east, with both parts of the county bordering Cheshire to the south. The territory comprising the county of Merseyside previously formed part of the administrative counties of Lancashire (east of the River Mersey) and Cheshire (west of the River Mersey). The two parts are linked by the two Mersey Tunnels, the Wirral Line of Merseyrail, and the Mersey Ferry.

Green belt

Merseyside contains green belt interspersed throughout the county, surrounding the Liverpool urban area, as well as across the Mersey in the Wirral area, with further pockets extending towards and surrounding Southport, as part of the western edge of the North West Green Belt. It was first drawn up from the 1950s. All the county's districts contain some portion of belt.

Identity
Ipsos MORI polls in the boroughs of Sefton and Wirral in the 2000s showed that in general, residents of these boroughs identified slightly more strongly to Merseyside than to Lancashire or Cheshire respectively, but their affinity to Merseyside was more likely to be "fairly strong" than "very strong".

Local government

Metropolitan boroughs
Merseyside comprises the metropolitan boroughs of Liverpool, Knowsley, Sefton, St Helens and Wirral.

County-level functions
Following the abolition of the county council some local services are run by joint-boards of the five metropolitan boroughs; these include the:

Merseyside Police
Merseyside Fire & Rescue Service
Merseytravel (who are also responsible for the Merseyrail network)
Merseyside Waste Disposal Authority
Merseyside Pension Scheme, administered by Wirral Borough Council, with offices in Liverpool

Liverpool City Region
The Liverpool City Region Combined Authority, which includes the five boroughs and the Borough of Halton headed by a mayor, Steve Rotheram, elected in May 2017.

Economy
This is a chart of the trend of regional gross value added of Merseyside at current basic prices published (pp. 240–253) by Office for National Statistics with figures in millions of British Pounds Sterling.

Transport

Transport in Merseyside consists of travel by roads, rail, air and water. Motorways serving Merseyside include M53 motorway in Wirral, M57 motorway, M58 motorway and M62 motorway. Rail travel is provided by Merseyrail, Network Rail and Wirral Tramway (since 1995) with major stations at Liverpool Lime Street, Liverpool Central, Liverpool James Street and Birkenhead Hamilton Square.
Borderlands line connects Wirral to Wales.
City Line (Merseyrail)
 Liverpool–Wigan line (and onward to Preston via the West Coast Main Line)
 Liverpool–Manchester lines (Middle and Southern Routes, including the branch to Warrington Bank Quay)
 Crewe–Liverpool line (and onward to Birmingham New Street via the West Coast Main Line)
Merseyrail commuter lines
Northern line (Merseyrail)
Wirral line
Aviation and air travel is provided by Liverpool John Lennon Airport, the oldest provincial airport in the United Kingdom. Major cycling routes on the National Cycle Network (such as National Cycle Route 56 and National Cycle Route 62) pass through the region too such as New Brighton and the Wirral Way. Major bus companies are Stagecoach Merseyside and Arriva North West. Liverpool One bus station serves as a terminus for national coach travel.

Maritime

Liverpool Cruise Terminal provides long-distance passenger cruises, Fred. Olsen Cruise Lines  and Cruise & Maritime Voyages  using the terminal to depart to Iceland, France, Spain and Norway.

Ferries
Prince's Landing Stage, Pier Head, Liverpool serves Isle of Man Steam Packet Company summer service to the Isle of Man (and Mersey Ferries).
Twelve Quays, Birkenhead ferry port serves winter Isle of Man ferry service and Stena Line to Belfast, Northern Ireland.

Commercial
The Port of Liverpool handles most commercial shipping, but several other ports on the Wirral peninsula,  such as Great Float and Queen Elizabeth II Dock, operate too.

River and Canal
The Mersey Ferry has operated since the 1200s, currently between Seacombe, Woodside and Liverpool Pier Head. Leeds and Liverpool Canal and Manchester Ship Canal are the main canal systems.

Sport

Merseyside is host to several football league football clubs including Liverpool F.C., Everton F.C., Tranmere Rovers F.C. and Southport F.C. Golf courses include Royal Liverpool Golf Club, Royal Birkdale Golf Club and Southport and Ainsdale Golf Club. Cricket clubs include the historic Aigburth Cricket Ground, Liverpool. Aintree Motor Racing Circuit hosted the British Grand Prix. Aintree Racecourse hosts the Grand National and there is also Haydock Park Racecourse. Totally Wicked Stadium hosts Rugby League and Hoylake hosts sailing (such as Southport 24 Hour Race) and is Britain's premier location for sand yachting. A ski slope facility is found at The Oval (Wirral).

Places of interest

Liverpool
Albert Dock
Anfield (Liverpool F.C. Stadium)
The Beatles Story Museum Liverpool at Albert Dock
The Cavern Club
Croxteth Hall
Gambier Terrace
Goodison Park (Everton F.C. Stadium)
HM Customs & Excise National Museum
International Slavery Museum
Liverpool Cathedral (Anglican)
Liverpool Metropolitan Cathedral (Roman Catholic)
Merseyside Maritime Museum
Mersey Tunnels – Queensway and Kingsway
Museum of Liverpool Life
Pier Head
Speke Hall – National Trust
St George's Hall
Tate Liverpool, a branch of the Tate Gallery
Walker Art Gallery
World Museum Liverpool

Knowsley
Knowsley Hall
Knowsley Safari Park

St Helens
The Dream
Haydock Park Racecourse
Langtree Park (St Helens Stadium) 
North West Museum of Road Transport
World of Glass

Sefton
Aintree Racecourse
Crosby Beach
Formby
Haig Avenue
Hugh Baird College
Lord Street, Southport
Meols Hall
Pleasureland Southport
Royal Birkdale Golf Club
Southport Pier

Wirral
Bidston Hill and Bidston Windmill
Birkenhead Park
Birkenhead Priory
Hamilton Square
Hilbre Island
Lady Lever Art Gallery
Leasowe Castle and Leasowe Lighthouse
North Wirral Coastal Park
Port Sunlight
Prenton Park (Tranmere Rovers F.C. Stadium) 
Royal Liverpool Golf Club
Williamson Art Gallery and Museum
Wirral Country Park

See also

1911 Liverpool general transport strike
List of commemorative plaques in Merseyside
List of drill halls in Merseyside
List of High Sheriffs of Merseyside
List of Lord Lieutenants of Merseyside
List of Sites of Special Scientific Interest in Merseyside
Merseyside derby

Notes

References

Further reading

External links

 Merseytravel website
 Merseyside.com local guide, A-Z, street index
 Merseyside Today - regional guide
 Mersey Reporter History - Merseyside History
 Merseyside Businesses online
 Mersey Life - Community

 
Metropolitan counties
North West England
NUTS 2 statistical regions of the United Kingdom
Counties of England established in 1974